AGRIS (International System for Agricultural Science and Technology) is a global public domain database with more than 12 million structured bibliographical records on agricultural science and technology. It became operational in 1975 and the database was maintained by Coherence in Information for Agricultural Research for Development, and its content is provided by more than 150 participating institutions from 65 countries. The AGRIS Search system, allows scientists, researchers and students to perform sophisticated searches using keywords from the AGROVOC thesaurus, specific journal titles or names of countries, institutions, and authors.

Early AGRIS years 

As information management flourished in the 1970s, the AGRIS metadata corpus was developed to allow its users to have free access to knowledge available in agricultural science and technology. AGRIS was developed to be an international cooperative system to serve both developed and developing countries.

With the advent of the Internet, along with the promises offered by open access publishing, there was growing awareness that the management of agricultural science and technology information, would have various facets: standards and methodologies for interoperability and facilitation of knowledge exchange; tools to enable information management specialists to process data; information and knowledge exchange across countries. Common interoperability criteria were thus adopted in its implementation, and the AGRIS AP metadata was accordingly created in order to allow exchange and retrieval of Agricultural information Resources.

AGRIS 2.0 

AGRIS covers the wide range of subjects related to agriculture science and technology, including forestry, animal husbandry, aquatic sciences and fisheries, human nutrition, and extension. Its content includes unique grey literature such as unpublished scientific and technical reports, theses, conference papers, government publications, and more. A growing number (around 20%) of bibliographical records have a corresponding full text document on the web which can easily be retrieved by Google.

On 5 December 2013 AGRIS 2.0 was released. AGRIS 2.0 is at the same time:

 A collaborative network of more than 150 institutions from 65 countries, maintained by FAO of the UN, promoting free access to agricultural information.
 A multilingual bibliographic database for agricultural science, fuelled by the AGRIS network, containing more than 8 million records largely enhanced with AGROVOC, FAO's multilingual thesaurus covering all areas of interest to FAO, including food, nutrition, agriculture, fisheries, forestry, environment etc.
 A mash-up web application that links the bibliographic AGRIS knowledge to related resources on the web using the Linked Open Data methodology. An AGRIS mashup page (e.g. http://agris.fao.org/agris-search/search.do?recordID=QM2008000025 ) is a web page where an AGRIS resource is displayed together with relevant knowledge extracted from external data sources (as the World Bank, DBPedia, and Nature). The availability of external data sources is not under AGRIS control. Thus, if an external data source is temporary unreachable, it won't be displayed in AGRIS mashup pages.

Access to the AGRIS Repository is provided through the AGRIS Search Engine.  As such, it:
 enables retrieval of bibliographic records contained in the AGRIS Repository,
 allows users to perform either full-text or fielded, parametric and assisted queries.

AGRIS data was converted to RDF and the resulting linked dataset created some 200 million triples.
AGRIS is also registered in the Data Hub at 

The AGRIS partners contributing to the AGRIS Database use several formats for exchanging data, including simple DC, from OAI-PMH systems.
The AGRIS AP format is anyway adopted directly by:
 Open Archive Initiative (OAI) partners: Scielo, Viikki Science Library
 BIBSYS, Norway, National Library of Portugal, Wageningen UR Library.
 National networks: NARIMS in Egypt, PhilAgriNet in Philippines, KAINet in Kenya, NAC in Thailand, GAINS in Ghana.
 National institutional repositories: Russia, Belarus, Uruguay, Spain, Iran.
 Information service providers: Wolters Kluwer, NISC, CGIR, CGIAR, AgNIC, GFIS.
 Database systems/tools: AgriOceanDspace, NewGenlib, WebAGRIS, NERAKIN, AgriDrupal.

AGRIS under the CIARD umbrella 
Falling under the umbrella of CIARD, a joint initiative co-led by the CGIAR, GFAR and FAO, the new AGRIS aims to promote the sharing and management of agricultural science and technology information through the use of common standards and methodologies. These will incorporate Web 2.0 features, in order to make the search experience as comprehensive, intuitive and far-reaching as possible for users of the new AGRIS.

Furthermore, the new AGRIS will also leverage the data and infrastructure of one of CIARD's projects: the CIARD RING. An acronym standing for Routemap to Information Nodes and Gateways (RING), the CIARD RING project is led by GFAR and it aims to:

 give an overview of the current offer of information services in ARD; as well as
 support those who want to implement new services.

A directory of ARD (Agricultural Research for Development) information services will allow the monitoring, describing and classifying of existing services, whilst benchmarking them against interoperability criteria, to ensure for maximum outreach and global availability.

See also 
 Agricultural Information Management Standards
 AgMES
 Agricultural Ontology Service
 AGROVOC
 Information management
 IMARK
 Disciplinary repository
List of academic databases and search engines

References

Other publications 
 Discovering, Indexing and Interlinking Information Resources (F1000research 2015)
 AGRIS: providing access to agricultural research data exploiting open data on the web (F1000research 2015)
 Migrating bibliographic datasets to the Semantic Web: The AGRIS case (Semantic Web journal 2013)
 Pushing, Pulling, Harvesting, Linking - Rethinking Bibliographic Workflows for the Semantic Web (EFITA-2013) 
 Agricultural Information and Knowledge Management Papers
 The AGRIS Application Profile for the International Information System on Agricultural Sciences and Technology Guidelines on Best Practices for Information Object Description
 Consultations on Agricultural Management (COAIM)
 First Consultation on Agricultural Information Management (2000 COAIM Report)
 Report on the Second Consultation on Agricultural Information Management (2002 COAIM Report)
 1968-1994: Insights and Lessons

External links 
 AGRIS
 AGRIS network map
 AGROVOC Web services
 Agricultural Information Management Standards (AIMS)
 Food and Agriculture Organization of the United Nations (FAO) Web site
 Coherence in Information for Agricultural Research for Development (CIARD) Wed site
 RSS feed of news and events

Food and Agriculture Organization
Public domain databases
Agricultural databases
E-agriculture